Black Fire is a studio album by American jazz pianist and composer Andrew Hill, released on Blue Note Records in 1964. It was Hill's debut for the label. Initially, drummer Philly Joe Jones was scheduled to play on the album, but was replaced by Roy Haynes after scheduling issues. The rest of the band consists of tenor saxophonist Joe Henderson and bassist Richard Davis. The Allmusic review by Stephen Thomas Erlewine calls the album "an impressive statement of purpose that retains much of its power decades after its initial release... a modern jazz classic."

Track listing 
All compositions by Andrew Hill.

"Pumpkin" – 5:24
 "Subterfuge" – 8:04
 "Black Fire" – 6:56
"Cantarnos" – 5:42
 "Tired Trade" – 5:51
 "McNeil Island" – 2:58
"Land of Nod" – 5:48

Bonus tracks on CD reissue
"Pumpkin'" [Alternate Take] - 5:16
 "Black Fire" [Alternate Take] - 5:48

Personnel 
 Andrew Hill – piano
 Joe Henderson – tenor saxophone
 Richard Davis – bass
 Roy Haynes – drums

References 

1964 albums
Modal jazz albums
Post-bop albums
Blue Note Records albums
Andrew Hill albums
Albums produced by Alfred Lion